Anthony Michael Brumley (born April 9, 1963) is an American former professional baseball utility player in Major League Baseball (MLB), who played primarily as a shortstop. He played from 1987 through 1995 for the Cubs (1987), Detroit Tigers (1989), Seattle Mariners (1990), Boston Red Sox (1991–1992), Houston Astros (1993, 1995) and Oakland Athletics (1994). Brumley was a switch-hitter and threw right-handed. He was the assistant hitting coach for the Chicago Cubs in 2014. He is the son of the catcher Mike Brumley.

Playing career
Brumley played for six different teams in a span of eight seasons. A late-inning defensive specialist, he was able to play all positions except pitcher and catcher. His most productive season came with the Detroit Tigers in 1989 when he posted career-highs in games played (92), at bats (212), runs (33), hits (42), doubles (5), runs batted in (RBIs) (11) and stolen bases (4). 

He was traded along with Keith Moreland from the Cubs to the San Diego Padres for Goose Gossage and Ray Hayward on February 12, 1988. Brumley was dealt from the Tigers to the Baltimore Orioles for Larry Sheets on January 10, 1990 in a transaction where he was headed to a team sacrificing a much-needed power hitter for a younger, less expensive player. He never played a regular season game with the Orioles who released him on April 3, just six days prior to the start of the 1990 campaign. Brumley was a .206 hitter with three home runs and 38 RBIs in 295 games.

Coaching career
After his playing career ended, he was the manager of the Salt Lake Stingers from 2002–2004, compiling a 202–229 record. From 2005–2007 he was the minor league field coordinator for the Texas Rangers. He was the manager of the Ogden Raptors for the 2008 season.

During 2009, Brumley worked in the Los Angeles Dodgers system, overseeing all aspects of instruction in the Dodgers minor league system.

On October 31, 2009, the Seattle Mariners announced that Brumley will serve as the team's third-base coach in 2010, replacing Bruce Hines.  Brumley later moved to the first-base coach's box for Seattle.  He joined the coaching staff of new Cubs manager Rick Renteria for 2014 as assistant hitting coach, but was dismissed from his position at the end of that season.

As of 2021, Brumley was the minor league hitting coordinator for the Atlanta Braves.

See also
 List of second-generation Major League Baseball players

References

External links

1963 births
Living people
American expatriate baseball people in Taiwan
American expatriate baseball players in Canada
Baseball coaches from Oklahoma
Baseball players from Oklahoma
Boston Red Sox players
Calgary Cannons players
Chicago Cubs coaches
Chicago Cubs players
Detroit Tigers players
Edmonton Trappers players
Houston Astros players
Iowa Cubs players
Las Vegas Stars (baseball) players
Major League Baseball first base coaches
Major League Baseball infielders
Major League Baseball outfielders
Major League Baseball third base coaches
Minor league baseball managers
New Britain Red Sox players
Oakland Athletics players
Pawtucket Red Sox players
Pittsfield Cubs players
Seattle Mariners coaches
Seattle Mariners players
Sportspeople from Oklahoma City
Tacoma Tigers players
Texas Longhorns baseball players
Toledo Mud Hens players
Tucson Toros players
Winter Haven Red Sox players
Anchorage Glacier Pilots players